Kakao Games Corp. (Hangul: 카카오게임즈) is a South Korean video game publisher and a subsidiary of Kakao. It specializes in developing and publishing games on PC, mobile, and VR platforms. Each is represented by Namgoong Hoon and Cho Gye-hyun.

Originally known as Daum Games before the acquisition of Daum, Kakao Games has expanded from game distribution solely in Korea. Now, Kakao Games distributes its games globally throughout North America, Europe, and other parts of Asia thanks in part to its social aspect with KakaoTalk. Kakao uses the game portal of Daum and social network of KakaoTalk to connect players within their games.

Games

Games released as "Daum Games"

Games released as "Kakao Games"

Cancelled Games 

Kakao Games was to be the publisher for Capcom Super League Online, a tactical role-playing game for Android and iOS phones developed by Capcom Entertainment Korea that was planned for release in South Korea only. The character-collecting game allowed the player to recruit from an all-star cast of characters from different Capcom IPs to fight against various villains. A closed beta test of the Android version was conducted from 4–7 October 2018. The game was scrapped due to an unspecified "business decision" between Kakao Games and Capcom, which also closed down its Korean branch.

Notes

References

External links
KakaoGames EUNA
KakaoGames
KakaoGames Services
KakaoGame
Daum Game

Kakao
Video game companies of South Korea
Video game development companies
Video game publishers